Mayetiola are a genus of flies from the family Cecidomyiidae. Most species are pests of cereal crops.

Species
Contains:
Mayetiola avenae (Marchal, 1895)
Mayetiola bimaculata (Rübsaamen, 1895)
Mayetiola dactylidis Kieffer, 1896
Mayetiola destructor (Say, 1817)
Mayetiola hellwigi (Rübsaamen, 1912)
Mayetiola holci Kieffer, 1896
Mayetiola hordei Kieffer, 1909
Mayetiola joannisi Kieffer, 1896
Mayetiola lanceolatae (Rübsaamen, 1895)
Mayetiola moliniae (Rübsaamen, 1895)
Mayetiola phalaris Barnes, 1928
Mayetiola piceae  Felt, 1926
Mayetiola poae (Bosc, 1817)
Mayetiola radicifica (Rübsaamen, 1895)
Mayetiola thujae (Hedlin, 1959)

References 

Cecidomyiinae
Cecidomyiidae genera